The 1979 Major League Baseball season. None of the post-season teams of 1977 or 1978 returned to this year's postseason. In a rematch of the 1971 World Series, the Pittsburgh Pirates defeated the Baltimore Orioles in seven games in the 1979 World Series.

Standings

American League

National League

Postseason

Bracket

Awards and honors

Baseball Hall of Fame
Warren Giles
Willie Mays
Hack Wilson

Regular Season Awards

Most Valuable Player
Don Baylor, California Angels, OF (AL)
Willie Stargell, Pittsburgh Pirates, 1B and Keith Hernandez, St. Louis Cardinals, 1B (NL)
Cy Young Award
Mike Flanagan, Baltimore Orioles (AL)
Bruce Sutter, Chicago Cubs (NL)
Rookie of the Year
John Castino, Minnesota Twins, 3B and Alfredo Griffin, Toronto Blue Jays, SS (AL)
Rick Sutcliffe, Los Angeles Dodgers, P (NL)

Postseason Awards
World Series MVP: Willie Stargell
American League Championship Series MVP:  None
National League Championship Series MVP: Willie Stargell
All-Star Game, July 17 at the Kingdome: National League, 7–6; Dave Parker, MVP

Gold Glove Award
American League
Cecil Cooper (1B) Milwaukee Brewers 
Frank White (2B) Kansas City Royals
Buddy Bell (3B) Texas Rangers
Rick Burleson (SS) Boston Red Sox
Dwight Evans (OF) Boston Red Sox
Fred Lynn (OF) Boston Red Sox
Sixto Lezcano (OF) Milwaukee Brewers
Jim Sundberg (C) Texas Rangers
Jim Palmer (P) Baltimore Orioles
National League
Keith Hernandez (1B) St. Louis Cardinals
Manny Trillo (2B) Philadelphia Phillies
Mike Schmidt (3B) Philadelphia Phillies
Dave Concepcion (SS) Cincinnati Reds
Garry Maddox (OF) Philadelphia Phillies
Dave Parker (OF) Pittsburgh Pirates
Dave Winfield (OF) San Diego Padres
Bob Boone (C) Philadelphia Phillies
Phil Niekro (P) Atlanta Braves

Statistical leaders

Home Field Attendance

Events

January–April
January 23 – Willie Mays receives 409 of 432 votes in the Baseball Writers' Association of America election to earn enshrinement in the Hall of Fame.
February 3 – The Minnesota Twins trade Rod Carew to the California Angels for Ken Landreaux, Dave Engle, Paul Hartzell and Brad Havens. His first season with the Angels, he helps his new team reach the post season for the first time, batting over .300 for the next five seasons, and being selected for the next six American League All-Star teams.
March 7 – The Special Veterans Committee selects Warren Giles and Hack Wilson for the Hall of Fame.
April – The 1979 Major League umpires strike begins with all umpires walking the picket lines, except two umpires (one from each league) who worked Opening Day with replacement and amateur umpires before leaving for the picket lines.
April 7 – The Houston Astros' Ken Forsch pitches a no-hitter against the Atlanta Braves in a 6–0 victory. At that time, it marks the earliest calendar date for a no-hitter in major league history, which stands until Hideo Nomo's no-hitter on April 4, 2001.  This also makes him and Bob Forsch, who hurled a no-hitter in 1978, the first brothers in major league history to both pitch no-hit games during their careers.
April 10 – Houston Astros pitcher J. R. Richard fires six wild pitches in a game.

May- August
May 15 – The 1979 Major League umpires strike is settled effective May 18.  The umpires gain pay raises and additional vacation time by the addition of another crew, but eight minor league umpires who worked during the strike are promoted to the Major Leagues, causing dissention and ostracizing of the replacements whom the regular umpires referred to as "scabs".
May 17 – Dave Kingman of the Chicago Cubs hits three home runs and Mike Schmidt of the Philadelphia Phillies hits two, the second of which proves to be the game winner in the tenth inning, as the Phillies beat the Cubs 23–22 at Wrigley Field. Bill Buckner had a grand slam and seven RBIs for Chicago. The game included a then Major League record 11 home runs and 50 hits.
May 28 – Texas Rangers first baseman Mike Jorgensen is hit in the head by a pitch from Boston Red Sox pitcher Andy Hassler. Dave Roberts comes into the game to pinch run for Jorgensen, and Pat Putnam takes over as the Rangers' regular first baseman for the next month. Aside from a pinch-hit appearance on May 31, Jorgensen does not play again until July 1. After suffering headaches, it is discovered he has a small blood clot inside his head, which apparently caused a seizure and could have resulted in his early demise.
June 8 – The Kansas City Royals use their fourth overall pick to draft Dan Marino.  In the seventeenth round, they select Stanford's John Elway.  Neither player would sign with the Royals, though they would go on to record-breaking careers in the National Football League.
June 12 – The Detroit Tigers hire Sparky Anderson as their new manager.
June 24 – In a 5–1 loss to the Rangers, Rickey Henderson debuts for the Oakland Athletics.  He singles and doubles;  the first of his over 3,000 career hits, and steals the first of his over 1,400 bases.
July 12 – The Detroit Tigers win the first game of a scheduled doubleheader against the Chicago White Sox, 4–1, on Disco Demolition Night at Chicago's Comiskey Park. Thousands of young fans swarm onto the field between the games, damaging the field and causing mayhem throughout the stadium.  The White Sox are forced to forfeit the second game.
July 17 – The National League wins its eighth straight All-Star Game, 7–6, at Seattle. Lee Mazzilli hits a home run to tie the game in the eighth, and walks in the ninth to bring in the winning run. Dave Parker, with two outstanding throws, is named the MVP, and Pete Rose plays a record five All-Star positions.
July 24 – Boston's Carl Yastrzemski hits his 400th home run off Oakland Athletics pitcher Mike Morgan in the 7th inning of the Red Sox's 7–3 win over the Athletics at Boston's Fenway Park.
August 2 – The Chicago White Sox announce that Don Kessinger has been fired as manager, and that he will be replaced by rookie manager Tony La Russa.
August 3 – Over 51,000 mourners attend a memorial service for New York Yankees captain Thurman Munson at Yankee Stadium, who was killed the day before in a plane crash.
August 5 – Fred Lynn hits his 100th career home run, helping the Red Sox beat Milwaukee Brewers 7–2.
August 6 – The entire New York Yankee team flies to Canton, Ohio for captain Thurman Munson's funeral. Hours later, the team returns to New York City and defeats the Baltimore Orioles 5–4 at Yankee Stadium, before a national viewing audience on ABC's Monday Night Baseball. Bobby Murcer, one of Munson's best friends, drives in all five Yankee runs with a three-run home run in the seventh inning and a two-run single in the bottom of the ninth.
August 13 – The St. Louis Cardinals' Lou Brock slashes his 3,000th hit off the hand of Chicago Cubs pitcher Dennis Lamp in a 3–2 Cardinals win at Busch Memorial Stadium.
August 29 – In his first pitching appearance in the Major Leagues in his 11-year career, Kansas City Royals utility player Jerry Terrell entered the game in relief against the New York Yankees and got three outs on just three pitches in the ninth inning of a 17–3 loss.

September–December
September 12 – Carl Yastrzemski records his 3000th career hit with a single off of New York Yankees' pitcher Jim Beattie.
September 15 – As part of a 10–2 win over the Baltimore Orioles, the Red Sox's Bob Watson hits for the cycle.  Having done it for the Houston Astros on June 24, 1977, he is the first player to do this in both leagues.
September 17 – George Brett hits his 20th triple of the season.  He is the first player since Willie Mays in 1957 to join the 20–20–20 club.
September 23 – Lou Brock steals the 938th base of his career, breaking Billy Hamilton's all-time National League record.  Brock's St. Louis Cardinals defeat the New York Mets 7–4 in ten innings.
September 24 – Pete Rose collects his 200th hit of the season, giving him ten seasons with at least 200 hits.  This breaks the record set by Ty Cobb.
September 28 – Garry Templeton of the St. Louis Cardinals collects his 100th hit of the season while batting right-handed.  Having already collected 100 hits while batting left-handed, Templeton is the first player in history to accomplish this.  He had batted right-handed, exclusively, for the last week of the season to get the needed hits.
October 17 – In Game Seven of the World Series, Willie Stargell hits his third home run of the Series to send the Pittsburgh Pirates to their third straight win over the Baltimore Orioles, to win the World Series Championship. Stargell wins Series MVP honors.  The Pirates came back from a deficit of 3 games-to-1.
November 13 – For the first time ever, there will be League co-MVPs as Keith Hernandez of the St. Louis Cardinals shares the National League Baseball Most Valuable Player Award with Willie Stargell of the Pittsburgh Pirates.  Stargell is the oldest person to win this award (since broken by Barry Bonds in 2004).  The Pirates have thus won (or shared) all four "Most Valuable Player" awards for the season (All-Star Game, National League Championship Series, World Series, and National League regular season).  This is the first such sweep in Major League history (Stargell had won the awards for the NLCS, World Series, and National League regular season, while teammate Dave Parker won the All-Star Game award).
November 26 – Third baseman John Castino, who batted .285 for the Minnesota Twins, and shortstop Alfredo Griffin, who hit .287 for the Toronto Blue Jays, tie for the American League Rookie of the Year Award, each receiving seven of the 28 votes. The deadlock precipitates a change in the voting system, effective in 1980.
November 28 – Los Angeles Dodgers pitcher Rick Sutcliffe, who posted a 17–10 record with a 3.46 ERA for a sub-.500 team, receives 20 of 24 votes to earn the National League Rookie of the Year honors. Right fielders Jeffrey Leonard of the Houston Astros (3) and Scot Thompson of the Chicago Cubs (1) receive the other votes.

References

External links
1979 Major League Baseball season schedule at Baseball Reference

 
Major League Baseball seasons